These are the official results of the Men's 20 km Walk event at the 1997 World Championships held on Saturday 2 August 1997 in Athens, Greece. There were a total number of 49 participating athletes.

Medalists

Abbreviations
All times shown are in hours:minutes:seconds

Records

Startlist

Intermediates

Final ranking

See also
 1994 Men's European Championships 20km Walk (Helsinki)
 1996 Men's Olympic 20km Walk (Atlanta)
1997 Race Walking Year Ranking
 1998 Men's European Championships 20km Walk (Budapest)

References
 Results
 Die Leichtathletik-Statistik-Seite

W
Racewalking at the World Athletics Championships